Lamoni is a city in Decatur County, Iowa, United States. The population was 1,969 at the time of the 2020 Census. Lamoni is the home of Graceland University, affiliated with the Community of Christ, and the city was the church's headquarters from 1880 to 1920, when it moved to Independence, Missouri.

History
The Lamoni area was first settled in 1834 to 1840 by people who thought they were settling in slave-owning Missouri. It was only after the Sullivan Line separating Missouri and Iowa was formally surveyed when Iowa became a state in 1846 that they realized they were in non-slave-owning Iowa.

In 1851, refugees from the Hungarian Revolution of 1848 sought to settle the area and form the community of New Buda (named for a neighborhood of Budapest). Their efforts did not result in a significant settlement.

In 1870, Joseph Smith III authorized the Order of Enoch to purchase over 3,000 acres (12 km) to form a community of the Reorganized Church of Jesus Christ of Latter Day Saints (RLDS Church). Smith lived in Liberty Hall, now a museum.

The city was named after Lamoni, a king mentioned in the Book of Mormon.

Lamoni, just north of the Missouri border, was chosen because of its good farmland and because it is about 100 miles north of Temple Lot, an important location in church teachings. The Mormons were evicted from Temple Lot and Missouri in the 1838 Mormon War.

Members of the Church of Jesus Christ of Latter-day Saints, led by Brigham Young, passed through the community in 1846, staying at nearby Garden Grove, Iowa, while en route from Nauvoo, Illinois (where they had settled after being forced to leave Missouri), to the Salt Lake Valley.

Lamoni was formally platted adjacent to newly laid tracks of the Chicago, Burlington and Quincy Railroad in 1879. By 1900, its population had grown to 1,500.

In 1880, Smith moved to Lamoni (as did the RLDS Church headquarters) from Plano, Illinois.

In 1895, the church founded Graceland University in Lamoni.

After the Smith family moved to Independence to the area near Temple Lot in 1916, Liberty Hall served as a home for the aged, a farmhouse, a Civilian Conservation Corps (CCC) camp, and a private residence before becoming a museum.

Charles Hyde and David Vredenburg, members of the church affiliated with the church-owned General Supply Company, which owned Lamoni mills, hardware and grocery stores, started a grocery store chain called the Supply Store in 1930, which in turn became Hy-Vee (from their two names). Lamoni remained the company's headquarters until 1945, when it moved to Chariton, Iowa.

The Lamoni area has a sizable Amish community, whose businesses are not open on Sundays.

Geography
Lamoni is located in southwest Decatur County on US Route 69.

Climate
Lamoni has a humid continental climate (Köppen climate classification Dfa).

Demographics

2010 census
As of the census of 2010, there were 2,324 people, 770 households, and 427 families living in the city. The racial makeup of the city was 88.6% White, 5.7% African American, 0.6% Native American, 1.1% Asian, 0.7% Pacific Islander, 1.1% from other races, and 2.0% from two or more races. Hispanic or Latino of any race were 4.5% of the population.

There were 770 households, of which 24% had children under the age of 18 living with them, 42.7% were married couples living together, 9.2% had a female householder with no husband present, and 44.5% were non-families. 32.3% of all households were made up of individuals, and 13.6% had someone living alone who was 65 years of age or older. The average household size was 2.25 and the average family size was 2.84.

27.8% were under the age of 20, 25.6% from 20 to 24, 11.9% from 25 to 44, 15.8% from 45 to 64, and 15.5% were 65 years of age or older. The median age was 23.5 years. For every 100 females, there were 98.6 males. For every 100 females age 18 and over, there were 96.9 males.

2000 census
As of the census of 2000, there were 2,444 people, 818 households, and 428 families living in the city. The racial makeup of the city was 91.86% White, 2.95% African American, 0.16% Native American, 1.60% Asian, 0.41% Pacific Islander, 0.82% from other races, and 2.21% from two or more races. Hispanic or Latino of any race were 2.78% of the population.

There were 818 households, out of which 21.4% had children under the age of 18 living with them, 44.7% were married couples living together, 5.9% had a female householder with no husband present, and 47.6% were non-families. 36.7% of all households were made up of individuals, and 16.5% had someone living alone who was 65 years of age or older. The average household size was 2.14 and the average family size was 2.84.

15.1% were under the age of 18, 39.6% from 18 to 24, 13.9% from 25 to 44, 15.6% from 45 to 64, and 15.8% were 65 years of age or older. The median age was 23. For every 100 females, there were 93.2 males. For every 100 females age 18 and over, there were 92.2 males.

The median income for a household in the city was $42,083, and the median income for a family was $53,363. Males had a median income of $37,700 versus $26,563 for females. The per capita income for the city was $14,279. About 6.9% of families and 15.3% of the population were below the poverty line, including 7.2% of those under age 18 and 9.2% of those age 65 or over.

Education
The Lamoni Community School District operates local public schools.

Notable people

Paul Ballantyne, actor
Jack Parker, athlete
William W. Blair, RLDS Church leader
Eveline Burgess, chess champion
Steven V. Carter, politician
Caitlyn Jenner, athlete and television personality
Floyd M. McDowell, RLDS Church leader
Alexander Hale Smith, RLDS Church leader
Heman C. Smith, RLDS Church leader
Israel A. Smith, RLDS Church leader
Joseph Smith III, RLDS Church leader
W. Wallace Smith, RLDS Church leader
Wallace B. Smith, RLDS Church leader
 Eddie Watt, Major League Baseball pitcher

References

External links

Official City Website
City-Data Comprehensive Statistical Data and more about Lamoni

Cities in Iowa
Cities in Decatur County, Iowa
Latter Day Saint movement in Iowa